Harney is an unincorporated community in Thomson Township, Carlton County, Minnesota, United States.  It lies between Cloquet and Duluth.

Harney is located 6 miles east (northeast) of the city of Cloquet; and 15 miles southwest of the city of Duluth.

North Cloquet Road, Marks Road, and Harney Road are three of the main routes in Harney.

Canosia Road and Carlton County Road 61 are nearby.

The community of Esko is adjacent to Harney.

Further reading
 Official State of Minnesota Highway Map – 2011/2012 edition
 Mn/DOT map of Carlton County – 2012 edition

Unincorporated communities in Carlton County, Minnesota
Unincorporated communities in Minnesota